Statue of Henry Wadsworth Longfellow may refer to:

 Henry Wadsworth Longfellow Memorial
 Henry Wadsworth Longfellow Monument